

The Albatros L 60 was a two-seat German utility aircraft of the 1920s developed from the Albatros L 59. It was a single-engine low-wing cantilever monoplane with large, spatted undercarriage.

Specifications (L 60)

See also

References
 
 German Aircraft between 1919–1945

L 060
Single-engined tractor aircraft
1920s German civil utility aircraft
Low-wing aircraft
Aircraft first flown in 1923